Helastia plumbea is a moth of the family Geometridae. This species is endemic to New Zealand. It was first described by Alfred Philpott in 1915 and originally named Xanthorhoe plumbea.

References

Moths of New Zealand
Endemic fauna of New Zealand
Moths described in 1915
Taxa named by Alfred Philpott
Cidariini
Endemic moths of New Zealand